Helen Graham may refer to:

People
 Helen Graham (bowls), Zambian lawn bowler
 Helen Graham (historian), English historian
 Helen Matthews, Scottish footballer

Fictional characters
 Helen Graham (EastEnders)
 Helen Graham (The Tenant of Wildfell Hall)
 Helen Graham, in Peril at End House

Other

 Helen F. Graham Cancer Center, Stanton, Delaware